Ctenophryne geayi (common name: brown egg frog) is a species of frog in the family Microhylidae. It is widely distributed in the northern parts of South America, in the Guianas (Guyana, Suriname, French Guiana) and in the Amazon Basin in Venezuela, Colombia, Ecuador, Peru, Bolivia, and Brazil. It might actually represent two species.

Description
Adult males measure  and adult females  in snout–vent length. The body is rotund, and the head is narrower than the body. The snout is blunt from above and rounded, slightly projecting in profile. The tympanic ring is barely visible externally. The fingers have rounded tips. The toes have flattened tips and webbing that is more extensive in males than in females. Coloration is pale brown dorsally, with darker brown flanks and anterior and posterior surfaces of the thighs. The throat is dark grayish brown, and other ventral surfaces are dark brown with white flecks. A vertebral line might be present. There are two ventral color patterns.

Habitat and conservation
It is a secretive species that is nocturnal and fossorial, found above ground only during brief explosive periods of reproduction in pools. It can locally suffer from habitat loss but is not overall threatened; it occurs in many protected areas.

References

geayi
Amphibians of Bolivia
Amphibians of Brazil
Amphibians of Colombia
Amphibians of Ecuador
Amphibians of French Guiana
Amphibians of Guyana
Amphibians of Peru
Amphibians of Suriname
Amphibians of Venezuela
Taxa named by François Mocquard
Amphibians described in 1904
Taxonomy articles created by Polbot